Clathrin-independent carriers (CLICs) are prevalent tubulovesicular membranes responsible for non-clathrin mediated endocytic events.  They appear to endocytose material into GPI-anchored protein-enriched early endosomal compartment (GEECs).  Collectively, CLICs and GEECs comprise the Cdc42-mediated CLIC/GEEC endocytic pathway, which is regulated by GRAF1.

References

Peripheral membrane proteins